Windy Arbour is a stop on the Luas light-rail tram system in Dún Laoghaire–Rathdown, south of Dublin, Ireland. It opened in 2004 as a stop on the Green Line from St Stephen's Green station to Sandyford. It serves the suburbs of Windy Arbour, Churchtown, and Clonskeagh.

Location and access
The Green Line runs on mostly segregated track, making use of a disused railway alignment.  The Cowper stop is located between Churchtown Road Lower and St. Columbanus' Road. The stop has the signs, displays, shelters, and ticket machines common to all Luas stops. It has entrances from each of the neighbouring roads. The Churchtown Road entrance consists of a layby which can be used by cars and buses to drop off Luas passengers. The St. Columbanus' Road entrance is a paved plaza leading from a bend in the road to the northern end of the platforms.

The stop is also served by Dublin Bus routes 17, 44, and 61.

References

Luas Green Line stops in Dún Laoghaire–Rathdown